Keith Parris (31 July 1905 – 20 August 1991) was an Australian rules footballer who played with Essendon in the Victorian Football League (VFL).

Parris coached Beechworth in the Ovens & King Football League in 1933 and won the O&KFL best and fairest medal in 1933 too.

Parris was captain-coach of Narrandera's 1934 South West Football League's premiership. Parris also shared the 1934 - SWDFL best and fairest award with two other footballer's.

Parris later served in the Australian Army during World War II.

Notes

External links 

Keith Parris's playing statistics from The VFA Project

1905 births
1991 deaths
Australian rules footballers from Melbourne
Essendon Football Club players
Camberwell Football Club players
People from Flemington, Victoria
Australian Army personnel of World War II
Military personnel from Melbourne